Anthony Skorich (born 19 March 1990) is an Australian footballer.

Biography
Skorich was born in Perth. He attended John Curtin College of the Arts and graduated in 2007. In May 2009, Skorich was signed to a professional contract by Perth Glory.

On 15 February 2011, Skorich was released by the Perth Glory.

A-League career statistics 
(Correct as of 21 March 2011)

References

External links
 Perth Glory profile

Australian people of Croatian descent
A-League Men players
Australian soccer players
Living people
Perth Glory FC players
1990 births
People educated at John Curtin College of the Arts
Soccer players from Perth, Western Australia
Association football forwards